Nora Ivanova (born 1 June 1977), aka Nora Ivanova-Güner and later Nora Ivanova-Edletzberger, is a female sprinter of Bulgarian origin, who competed for Turkey before she obtained Austrian citizenship.

Running for Bulgaria
Nora Ivanova won the silver medal in 100 m and the gold medal in 200 m at the 1995 European Athletics Junior Championships held in Nyíregyháza, Hungary. She was the gold medalist in the 100 m event and the bronze medalist in the 200 m event at the 1996 World Junior Championships held in Sydney, Australia.  In 1997, she won the gold medal in 100 m at the European Athletics U23 Championships in Turku, Finland.

Ivanova became in 1996 national champion in 100 m with 11.46, and in 1997 in indoor 60 m with 7.35.

Turkish citizen
During the 1997 World Championships in Athletics in Athens, Greece, she met Turkish high jumper Kemal Güner of Fenerbahçe Athletics. The couple married in 1999. She became a Turkish citizen and converted to Islam adopting the Turkish name Nur Güner. However, she became known further as Nora Güner.

Nora Ivanova-Güner won the gold medal for Turkey in women's 200 m with 23.13 at the 55th Balkan Games held in Kavala, Greece. The next year, she earned two gold medals, one in 100 m and the other in 200 m at the 2001 Mediterranean Games held in Tunis, Tunisia.

As she had to care for her sick father Vladimir, she lived most of the time in Sofia apart from her husband. Kemal applied and obtained a residence permission to live in Bulgaria. In 2002, she decided to divorce and return to Bulgaria forever due to financial problems arisen through lack of sponsorships. After living with her husband in Sofia for a while, the couple divorced. She, however, continued to compete for Turkey.

She is the Turkey's national record holder in 100 m with 11.25 (2001) and 200 m with 22.71 (2002).

Austrian citizen
Nora Ivanova obtained the Austrian citizenship in June 2006 adopting the family name Edletzberger. She became Austrian champion in 100 m and 200 m in 2007. She is a member of the club LCC Wien, where she is coached by Konstantin Milanov.

Achievements

100 m

200 m

4×100m relay

References

1977 births
Living people
Bulgarian female sprinters
Bulgarian emigrants to Turkey
Naturalized citizens of Turkey
Turkish female sprinters
Fenerbahçe athletes
Austrian female sprinters
Austrian people of Bulgarian descent
Austrian people of Turkish descent
Bulgarian people of Turkish descent
Converts to Islam
Naturalised citizens of Austria
Mediterranean Games gold medalists for Turkey
Athletes (track and field) at the 2001 Mediterranean Games
Mediterranean Games medalists in athletics